Pseudopostega clavata is a moth of the family Opostegidae. It was described by Donald R. Davis and Jonas R. Stonis, 2007. It is known from south-eastern Puerto Rico.

The length of the forewings is 2.2–2.6 mm. Adults have been recorded in August.

Etymology
The species name is derived from the Latin clavatus (meaning clubbed), in reference to the diagnostic, clavate shape of the apex of the greatly enlarged basal fold of the male gnathos.

References

Opostegidae
Moths described in 2007